Boys & Girls is the debut studio album from American band Alabama Shakes. It was released on April 9, 2012 through ATO Records. The album peaked at number 6 on the US Billboard 200 and number 3 on the UK Albums Chart. A tenth anniversary deluxe edition was released on December 9, 2022, including a bonus disc of the band's live performance at KCRW's Morning Becomes Eclectic.

Composition
With Boys & Girls, Alabama Shakes craft a musical fusion of blues and rock 'n' roll. It also has roots in Southern soul, yielding a "raw, grainy" take on the style. The album also draws from hard rock and punk, working them alongside the band's "rootsy, passionate appeal".

Critical reception

The album has been well received by critics. Gavin Haynes of NME gave Boys & Girls a positive review, stating, "In many ways Boys & Girls it is as note-perfect an album as you'll hear all year, yet it's also often perfectly inert. Their new bestie Jack White flagrantly copied vast chunks of the past, but in so doing he also stripped it down and rebuilt it in his own image. Despite their obviously vast talent, still less than a year after they first read about themselves on the internet, the stellar rise and rise of Alabama Shakes possibly hasn't afforded them quite enough time to find out who they really are." Los Angeles Times also gave the album a positive review stating, "The Alabama Shakes’ first album, "Boys & Girls," is an electric jolt that anyone who loves blues-based rock music should track down immediately. Consisting of three men and one young explosion named Brittany Howard on vocals and guitar, the group, which formed in northern Alabama in 2009, offers stripped down truth, minus any affectation, histrionics or irony."

The album was listed at #34 on Rolling Stone's list of the top 50 albums of 2012.

Commercial performance
Boys & Girls debuted in the United States at number sixteen on the Billboard 200. On April 12, 2012 the album entered the Irish Albums Chart at number thirteen. The album entered the UK Albums Chart at number three, and also topped the inaugural Official Record Store Chart. As of April 2015, the album has sold 744,000 copies in the U.S.

Track listing

Personnel
Alabama Shakes:
Brittany Howard – lead vocals, guitar, piano, percussion
Heath Fogg – guitar, backing vocals, percussion
Zac Cockrell – bass, backing vocals, guitar
Steve Johnson – drums, backing vocals, percussion

Additional musicians:
Paul Horton – Farfisa organ and Rhodes piano on "Rise to the Sun", piano and organ on "I Ain't the Same"
Micah Hulscher – piano and organ on "I Found You" and "Hang Loose"
Mitch Jones – organ on "Heartbreaker"
Ben Tanner – piano and organ on "Be Mine"

Charts

Weekly charts

Year-end charts

Certifications

Release history

References

2012 debut albums
Alabama Shakes albums
ATO Records albums
Rough Trade Records albums